XHCLO-FM is a radio station on 107.1 FM in Monclova, Coahuila, Mexico. It is owned by Multimedios Radio and operated by NRT México.

History
XHCLO received its concession on March 14, 1997. It was owned by Multimedios Radio subsidiary Televideo Mexicana, S.A. de C.V.

On November 23, 2022, Multimedios and NRT México, owner of XHWGR-FM 101.1 and XHEMF-FM 96.3 as well as a local cable television channel, reached an agreement by which NRT would acquire XHCLO-FM and XHMTCO-TDT, the local Canal 6 transmitter, taking immediate possession of the facilities.

References

Radio stations established in 1997
1997 establishments in Mexico
Radio stations in Coahuila
Multimedios Radio